The 2015–16 Loyola Marymount Lions women's basketball team will represent Loyola Marymount University in the 2015–16 college basketball season. The Lions are members of the West Coast Conference, are led by head coach Charity Elliott, in her fourth season at the school. The Lions play their home games at the Gersten Pavilion on the university campus in Los Angeles, California. They finished the season 11–20, 6–12 in WCC play to finish in a tie for seventh place. They advanced to the quarterfinals of the WCC women's tournament where they lost to Saint Mary's.

Roster

Schedule

|-
!colspan=12 style="background:#8E0028; color:#00345B;"| Exhibition

|-
!colspan=12 style="background:#8E0028; color:#00345B;"| Non-conference regular season

|-
!colspan=12 style="background:#8E0028; color:#00345B;"| WCC regular season

|-
!colspan=12 style="background:#8E0028;"| WCC Women's Tournament

See also
Loyola Marymount Lions women's basketball
2015–16 Loyola Marymount Lions men's basketball team

References

Loyola Marymount Lions women's basketball seasons
Loyola Marymount